Care Bears & Cousins is an American CGI adventure animated television series released on November 6, 2015, on Netflix. The series, a continuation of the previous series Care Bears: Welcome to Care-a-Lot, re-introduces four of the Care Bear cousins - Brave Heart Lion, Bright Heart Raccoon, Lotsa Heart Elephant and Cozy Heart Penguin.

Synopsis 
Set in Care-a-Lot, a magical land in the clouds, Tenderheart Bear, Cheer Bear, Grumpy Bear, Share Bear, Harmony Bear, Funshine Bear and new playful, curious cub Wonderheart Bear all go on adventures that emphasize messages of caring and sharing. Human children from Earth often visit Care-a-Lot and participate in new adventures and valuable lessons learned. The Care Bears' mischievous frenemy King Beastly often attempts to make trouble for the bears.

Characters

Main Care Bears 
 Tenderheart Bear (voiced by David Lodge)
 Cheer Bear (voiced by Patty Mattson)
 Funshine Bear (voiced by Michael Sinterniklaas)
 Grumpy Bear (voiced by Doug Erholtz)
 Harmony Bear (voiced by Nayo Wallace)
 Share Bear (voiced by Stephanie Sheh)
 Wonderheart Bear (voiced by Michaela Dean)

Cousins 
 Brave Heart Lion (voiced by Braeden Fox)
 Bright Heart Raccoon (voiced by Ryan Wiesbrock)
 Lotsa Heart Elephant (voiced by Olivia Hack)
 Cosy Heart Penguin (voiced by Michael Sinterniklaas)

Other Care Bears 
 Amigo Bear
 Best Friend Bear
 Birthday Bear
 Good Luck Bear
 Love-a-Lot Bear
 Secret Bear
 Surprise Bear (voiced by Melissa Mable)
 Thanks-a-Lot Bear
 Wish Bear (voiced by Melissa Mable)

Other Care-a-Lot Residents 
 King Beastly (voiced by Doug Erholtz)

Episodes

Series overview

Season 1 (2015)

Season 2 (2016)

References

External links
 

2010s American animated television series
2015 American television series debuts
2016 American television series endings
American children's animated adventure television series
American children's animated comedy television series
American children's animated fantasy television series
American computer-animated television series
Animated television series about bears
Care Bears
Netflix children's programming
Animated television series by Netflix
English-language Netflix original programming
Television series about cousins
Television series by Splash Entertainment
Animated television series reboots